Akhaura Junction railway station is a railway junction located in Akhaura Upazila, Brahmanbaria District, Chittagong division, Bangladesh.

History
In response to the demands of tea manufacturers of Assam for a railway line with the port of Chittagong, the Assam Bengal Railway started construction of railway lines in eastern Bengal from 1891. Chittagong–Comilla line was opened in 1895. On 1 July 1895, the 150 km Chittagong–Comilla and the 69 km Laksam–Chandpur lines were opened to the public. In 1896, Comilla–Akhaura–Shahbajpur line was established.

In the same year it was opened as a station of Comilla–Akhaura–Shahbajpur line. It became a junction station when the railway line from Akhaura to Tongi was built.

References

External link
 

Railway stations in Chittagong Division
Railway junction stations in Bangladesh
Railway stations opened in 1896